The Royal Perth Yacht Club (RPYC) is a yacht club in Perth, Western Australia. It is the third oldest yacht club in Australia after the Royal Yacht Club of Victoria and the Royal Sydney Yacht Squadron. It is based at the Crawley Marina on Pelican Point and at the Fremantle Annexe in Challenger Harbour.

Royal Perth Yacht Club is a member of the International Council of Yacht Clubs.

Since 2000, Royal Perth Yacht Club has hosted the Sailability WA program to provide opportunities for people with disabilities to engage in sailing activities.

Early history 

The Royal Perth Yacht Club can trace its origins to 1841 when a group of sailors staged a modest regatta to celebrate Foundation Day. In 1865, this original group of pioneer sailors formalised the Perth Yacht Club.

Early regattas at the club included yacht races and gig rowing races. Duck hunting was also popular at this time.

In 1880 a jetty was built at the foot of William Street on Perth Water. The clubhouse opened in 1889 and in 1890 it received the Royal charter from Queen Victoria on the recommendation of Governor Sir Frederic Napier Broome, and the Lords of the Admiralty granted the club the Royal Warrant to fly a blue ensign.

At a general meeting in 1891, the old blue Perth Yacht Cub burgee was replaced with white burgee, featuring a red triangular St George's Cross with a St Edward's Crown in the upper canton.

In 1920, the clubhouse was extended and the club formed the Royal Australian Naval Volunteer Reserve in Western Australia. The club shifted to Crawley on Melville Water in 1953 when the William Street site, through siltation, became unusable.

America's Cup
RPYC fielded the yacht Southern Cross in the 1974 America's Cup, the first aluminium yacht to compete in the regatta, and the yacht Australia in the 1977 America's Cup and the 1980 America's Cup.

In 1983 an Australian syndicate representing the Royal Perth Yacht Club fielded the Australia II, skippered by John Bertrand, against defender Liberty, skippered by Dennis Conner. Australia II won the match races to win the America's Cup - the first winning challenge to the New York Yacht Club, which had successfully defended the cup over a period of 132 years.

Australia II innovative design by Ben Lexen, included features such as a reduced waterline length and a short chord winged keel.

Prime Minister Bob Hawke was interviewed at the celebrations on the morning of September 27, 1983 at Royal Perth Yacht Club, where he made the famous statement to journalists that "Any boss who sacks a worker for not turning up today is a bum".

RPYC hosted the 1987 defence off Fremantle Harbour at a newly established annex during the Australian summer months between October 1986 and February 1987. The American challenger Stars & Stripes 87, sailed by Dennis Conner, beat the Australian defender Kookaburra III, sailed by Iain Murray, four wins to nil in the best of seven series. This regatta marked the last time that 12-metre class yachts were used in the America's Cup.

The entrance road to RPYC in Crawley was commemoratively renamed Australia II Drive. To mark the 30th anniversary of the America's Cup victory, the second mast of the Australia II was permanently installed by the foreshore outside the clubhouse from which the undefaced Blue ensign and Club burgee are flown.

Notable sailors and events 

A number of sailors from RPYC have competed in the Summer Olympics and Paralympics. These include:
 Noel Robbins (Sonar Class - won gold at the 2000 Paralympics)
 Jamie Dunross (Sonar Class - won gold at the 2000 Paralympics)
 Graeme Martin (Sonar Class - won gold at the 2000 Paralympics, won bronze at the 2008 Paralympics, won gold at the 2016 Paralympics)
 Elise Rechichi (470 Class - won gold at the 2008 Olympics)
 Tessa Parkinson (470 Class - won gold at the 2008 Olympics)
 Rachel Cox (Skud18 Class - won sliver at the 2008 Paralympics)
 Colin Harrison (Sonar Class - won bronze at the 2008 Paralympics, won gold at the 2016 Paralympics)
 Russel Boaden (Sonar Class - won bronze at the 2008 Paralympics, won gold at the 2016 Paralympics)

In 1979, the RPYC organised the 20,000 kilometre Parmelia Race from Plymouth, England to Perth in order to mark the 150th anniversary of Western Australia. Competitors were invited to recreate the 1829 voyage of the merchant barque Parmelia bringing the first British settlers to the Swan River Colony.

Jon Sanders was the first sailor to circumnavigate Antarctica solo, circling the continent twice from 1981 to 1982. Sanders is the record-holder for the longest distance ever sailed continuously by any vessel following his triple non-stop solo circumnavigation of the globe from 1986 to 1988.

RPYC hosted the 2011 ISAF Sailing World Championships, a significant qualifying event for the 2012 Summer Olympics.

References

Further reading

Royal yacht clubs
America's Cup yacht clubs
Crawley, Western Australia
Perth Yacht Club, Royal
Sports clubs established in 1865
Swan River (Western Australia)
Yacht clubs in Western Australia
1865 establishments in Australia
1987 America's Cup